WOCC (1550 AM) is a radio station broadcasting a classic country music format. Licensed to Corydon, Indiana, United States, the station serves the Louisville, Kentucky, area. The station is currently owned by Dawn Fowler and Tim Jackson, through licensee Two Hawks Communications LLC. Its former owner was Richard Lee Brabandt.

History
The station went on the air in 1964 as call sign WPDF, and was owned by Harrison Radio, Inc. The station was assigned the call sign WJDW on September 29, 1979. WJDW obtained an FM license at 96.5 FM. On October 20, 1989, WJDW sold the FM and its FM call sign was changed to WGZB; On February 4, 1991, WJDW changed its AM call sign to the current WOCC.

Translator
In 2013, WOCC gained an FM translator on 102.7 MHz with the call sign W274AD.

References

External links

OCC
Classic country radio stations in the United States